MRC II Distribution Company L.P., doing business as MRC (formerly Media Rights Capital), is an American film and television studio. Founded by Mordecai (Modi) Wiczyk and Asif Satchu, the company funds and produces film and television programming.

The company's divisions include MRC Film, MRC Non-Fiction, and MRC Television. In 2018, the company merged with Todd Boehly's media assets under Valence Media, with the company as a whole taking on the MRC name in 2020; this included Dick Clark Productions (briefly known as MRC Live & Alternative), audience data firm Luminate (the former Nielsen SoundScan), and the entertainment industry publications Billboard and The Hollywood Reporter. Boehly (through Eldridge Industries) re-acquired most of these assets in August 2022.

The company's most notable productions have included the Netflix series House of Cards and Ozark, and the films Baby Driver, Knives Out, and Ted.

History

Early history 
MRC's investors include Guggenheim Partners, AT&T, WPP Group, Goldman Sachs and ABRY Partners. On September 4, 2007, it funded top directors, namely Robert Rodriguez, Ricky Gervais, Walter Salles, Ryan Murphy, Richard Kelly, Bennett Miller and Todd Field, which both spent $250 million in film funding. On December 5, 2007, it inked a pact with Warner Bros. Pictures, in which MRC allowed WB to distribute three of the eight pictures over a $250 million feature production funding.

Keith Samples had briefly joined the television division of the studio, which was announced in early 2008. On June 24, 2008, Dawn Parouse, who produced Prison Break, had joined the television division of the studio. On October 22, 2008, Keith Samples had been resigned as president of the Media Rights Capital television division.

In 2008, The CW leased its Sunday-night schedule to MRC beginning in the 2008-09 television season. MRC scheduled the reality show In Harm's Way and the dramas Valentine and Easy Money. In November 2008, after all four shows drew poor viewership, The CW announced that it would withdraw from the agreement. The network returned the Sunday timeslots to its affiliates in the 2009–10 season.

After acquiring rights to produce a U.S. remake of the BBC miniseries House of Cards, MRC would sell the series to the streaming service Netflix in 2011, where it ran for six seasons as one of its first original series.

On February 1, 2018,  Eldridge Industries, a holding company owned by former Guggenheim Partners president Todd Boehly, announced that it would contribute its media assets — including The Hollywood Reporter, Dick Clark Productions, and Billboard, and merge them with MRC into a new company known as Valence Media. In October 2018, MRC formed a joint venture with United Talent Agency known as Civic Center Media, which seeks to back projects involving its members via MRC.

2019–2022: Valence Media and PMRC 
In December 2019, Valence Media acquired Nielsen Holdings' music data business, with the division being rebranded as MRC Data.

In April 2020, it was reported that Valence Media would rebrand under the MRC name. The rebranding was completed in July 2020.

On September 23, 2020, it was announced that Penske Media Corporation, owner of The Hollywood Reporter's main competitor Variety, would assume operations of the MRC Media & Info publications under a joint venture with MRC known as PMRC. In turn, MRC will form a second joint venture that will develop content tied to PMRC publications.

In September 2021, former E! president Adam Stotsky became the new president of MRC Live & Alternative, replacing the outgoing Amy Thurlow. At this time, Dick Clark Productions was folded into MRC Live & Alternative and discontinued as a brand.

2022–present: Unwinding of the Valence merger 
In August 2022, Eldridge agreed with Wiczyk and Satchu to divide MRC's assets, effectively undoing the 2018 Valence Media merger. Eldridge re-acquired the company's live and alternative division (which resumed business as Dick Clark Productions), as well as MRC's share of the PMRC joint venture, Luminate (the former MRC Data), and investments in studios including A24 and Fulwell 73. The remaining MRC entity, in which Eldridge will retain a minority stake, will retain its scripted film and TV production entity as well as investments in Civic Center Media and T-Street Productions.

SpinMedia 
SpinMedia (formerly Buzz Media) was an American digital publisher that owned a number of pop culture websites, including Spin, Stereogum, Vibe, and The Frisky. It was founded by Anthony Batt (CEO), Marc Brown, Kevin Woolery, and Steve Haldane under the name Buzznet.

In 1999, Anthony Batt and Marc Brown started a blog, and by 2006, Buzznet had a total of nine employees in the Los Angeles, California, area. The Buzz Media name was created as the company started to acquire more pop-culture and music blogs.

On March 19, 2009, the company announced that it raised US$12.5 million in funding from venture capitalists including Anthem Ventures, New Enterprise Associates, Redpoint Ventures, and Sutter Hill Ventures, and Focus Ventures.

The company acquired Spin Media, publisher of Spin magazine, in July 2012. After shutting down the print version of the magazine, reducing its staff to about 200, and focusing on advertising, it rebranded itself as SpinMedia in March 2013. At that time, Steve Hansen became its chief executive.

In April 2013, it acquired Vibe magazine. 

In 2014, M/C Partners became the primary owner of SpinMedia after an assignment for benefit of creditors.  That year, Buzz Media had also acquired music sites Property of Zack, AbsolutePunk.net, Under The Gun Review, and Punknews.org.

In September 2016, SpinMedia sold Buzznet, Idolator, and PureVolume to startup corporation Hive Media. In December of that year, Eldridge Industries acquired Spin, Vibe, Stereogum, and Death and Taxes via the Hollywood Reporter-Billboard Media Group for an undisclosed amount, making Billboard the world's largest music brand in terms of digital traffic and audience share. Celebuzz, The Frisky, and The Superficial were sold to CPX Interactive.

In January 2020, Spin and Stereogum were sold to Next Management Partners and the site's management, respectively, as part of a larger focus on Vibe and a music data business.

Filmography 

Films produced or co-financed by MRC have included:
Babel (2006)
Linha de Passe (2008)
Brüno (2009)
Shorts (2009)
The Invention of Lying (2009)
The Box (2009)
Devil (2010)
The Adjustment Bureau (2011)
30 Minutes or Less (2011)
Ted (2012)
Elysium (2013)
A Million Ways to Die in the West (2014)
22 Jump Street (2014)
Think Like a Man Too (2014)
Sex Tape (2014)
Chappie (2015)
Furious 7 (2015)
Ted 2 (2015)
Hotel Transylvania 2 (2015)
Baby Driver (2017)
The Dark Tower (2017)
Hotel Transylvania 3: Summer Vacation (2018)
Mortal Engines (2018)
Dora and the Lost City of Gold (2019)
Knives Out (2019)
The Lovebirds (2020)
The SpongeBob Movie: Sponge on the Run (2021)
The Sparks Brothers (2021)
Peter Rabbit 2: The Runaway (2021)
Hotel Transylvania: Transformania (2022)
Jerry & Marge Go Large (2022)
Persuasion (2022)
The Blackening (2023)
The Mothership (2023)

Television projects

Current 
 The Great (2020–present) for Hulu
 Shining Girls (2022–present) for Apple TV+
 So You Think You Can Dance (2022–present) for Fox
The Terminal List (2022–present) for Amazon Prime Video
Poker Face (2023–present) for Peacock
Hello Tomorrow! (2023–present) for Apple TV+

Upcoming 
Ted for Peacock

Previous 
 In Harm's Way (2008) for The CW
 Valentine (2008) for The CW
 Easy Money (2008) for The CW
 The Life & Times of Tim (2008–2012) for HBO
 Rita Rocks (2008–2009) for Lifetime
 Seth MacFarlane's Cavalcade of Cartoon Comedy (2008–2009) for YouTube
 The Goode Family (2009) for ABC
 Surviving Suburbia (2009) for ABC
 Kröd Mändoon and the Flaming Sword of Fire (2009) for Comedy Central
 Shaq Vs. (2009–2010) for ABC
 The Ricky Gervais Show (2010–2012) for HBO
 How to Be a Gentleman (2011–2012) for CBS
 House of Cards (2013–2018) for Netflix
 Blunt Talk (2015–2016) for Starz
 Ozark (2017–2022) for Netflix
 Counterpart (2017–2019) for Starz
 The Outsider (2020) for HBO
 The Shrink Next Door (2021) for Apple TV+

References

External links 

Film production companies of the United States
Television production companies of the United States
Financial services companies of the United States
Companies based in Los Angeles
Blog networks